Siah Rudbar may refer to:
 Siah Rudbar, Gilan
 Siah Rudbar, Golestan